The 2011 5-hour Energy 500 was a NASCAR Sprint Cup Series race held on June 12, 2011 at Pocono Raceway in Long Pond, Pennsylvania. Contested over 200 laps on the 2.5-mile (4.0 km) asphalt tri-oval, it was the 14th race of the 2011 Sprint Cup Series season.  The race was won by Jeff Gordon for the Hendrick Motorsports team. Kurt Busch finished second, and Kyle Busch clinched third.

References

5-hour Energy 500
5-hour Energy 500
NASCAR races at Pocono Raceway
June 2011 sports events in the United States